Faithful is a 1910 short comedy film directed by D. W. Griffith and starring Mack Sennett, a future studio owner and comedy director.

Cast
Arthur V. Johnson - John Dobbs
Mack Sennett - Zeke (Faithful)
Florence Barker - John's Sweetheart
Kate Bruce - Mother of John's Sweetheart

uncredited
Francis Grandon - Neighbor
Dell Henderson - Bystander
W. Chrystie Miller - Neighbor
Anthony O'Sullivan - Bystander/Neighbor
Frank Powell - Butler (unconfirmed)
Billy Quirk - Neighbor
Dorothy West - Neighbor

See also
 List of American films of 1910

References

External links

Faithful available for free download at Internet Archive

1910 films
American silent short films
Films directed by D. W. Griffith
Biograph Company films
1910 short films
1910 comedy films
American comedy short films
American black-and-white films
Silent American comedy films
1910s American films